This article lists diplomatic missions resident in the Kingdom of Denmark. The Kingdom of Denmark as a sovereign state consists of three countries incorporated in to the unity of the Realm (Denmark (proper), Greenland, Faroe Islands).

At present, the capital city of Copenhagen hosts 72 embassies. Several other countries have ambassadors accredited to the Kingdom, with most being resident in Berlin, London or Stockholm. This listing excludes honorary consulates.

Embassies in Copenhagen

Representatives Offices in Copenhagen

Consulates in the Danish Realm

High Commissions

Tórshavn, Faroe Islands
 (High Commission)

Nuuk, Greenland
 (High Commission)

Accredited embassies

Former embassies

See also 
 Foreign relations of Denmark
 List of diplomatic missions of Denmark
 Visa requirements for Danish citizens
 List of diplomatic missions in Greenland

Notes

References

External links 
 Copenhagen Diplomatic List

Foreign relations of Denmark
Foreign relations of the Faroe Islands
Foreign relations of Greenland
Denmark
Diplomatic missions
Diplomatic missions in Denmark
Diplomatic missions in the Faroe Islands
Diplomatic missions in Greenland